is a railway station in the city of Nikkō, Tochigi, Japan, operated by the Yagan Railway.

Lines
Kawaji-Onsen Station is served by the Yagan Railway Aizu Kinugawa Line and is located 4.8 rail kilometers from end of the line at Shin-Fujiwara Station.

Station layout
The station has a single elevated island platform, with the station building located underneath.

Adjacent stations

History
Kawaji-Onsen Station opened on October 9, 1986.

Surrounding area
 
Kinugawa River

External links

Yagen Railway Station information 

Railway stations in Tochigi Prefecture
Railway stations in Japan opened in 1986
Nikkō, Tochigi